Universalism is the philosophical and theological concept that some ideas have universal application or applicability.

A belief in one fundamental truth is another important tenet in universalism. The living truth is seen as more far-reaching than the national, cultural, or religious boundaries or interpretations of that one truth. As the Rig Veda states, "Truth is one; sages call it by various names." A community that calls itself universalist may emphasize the universal principles of most religions, and accept others in an inclusive manner.

In the modern context, Universalism can also mean the Western pursuit of unification of all human beings across geographic and other boundaries under Western values, or the application of really universal or universalist constructs, such as human rights or international law.

Universalism has had an influence on modern-day Hinduism, in turn influencing modern Western spirituality.

Christian universalism refers to the idea that every human will eventually receive salvation in a religious or spiritual sense, a concept also referred to as universal reconciliation.

Philosophy

Universality

In philosophy, universality is the notion that universal facts can be discovered and is therefore understood as being in opposition to relativism and nominalism.

Moral universalism 

Moral universalism (also called moral objectivism or universal morality) is the meta-ethical position that some system of ethics applies universally. That system is inclusive of all individuals, regardless of culture, race, sex, religion, nationality, sexual orientation, or any other distinguishing feature. Moral universalism is opposed to moral nihilism and moral relativism. However, not all forms of moral universalism are absolutist, nor do they necessarily value monism. Many forms of universalism, such as utilitarianism, are non-absolutist. Other forms such as those theorized by Isaiah Berlin, may value pluralist ideals.

Religion

Baháʼí Faith

In the teachings of the Baháʼí Faith, a single God has sent all the historic founders of the world religions in a process of progressive revelation. As a result, the major world religions are seen as divine in origin and are continuous in their purpose. In this view, there is unity among the founders of world religions, but each revelation brings a more advanced set of teachings in human history and none are syncretic. In addition, the Baháʼí teachings acknowledge that in every country and every people God has always revealed the divine purpose via messengers and prophets, masters and sages since time immemorial.

Within this universal view, the unity of humanity is one of the central teachings of the Baháʼí Faith. The Baháʼí teachings state that since all humans have been created in the image of God, God does not make any distinction between people with regard to race, colour or religion. Thus, because all humans have been created equal, they all require equal opportunities and treatment. Hence the Baháʼí view promotes the unity of humanity, and that people's vision should be world-embracing and that people should love the whole world rather than just their nation.

The teaching, however, does not equate unity with uniformity; instead the Baháʼí writings advocate the principle of unity in diversity where the variety in the human race is valued. Operating on a worldwide basis this cooperative view of the peoples and nations of the planet culminates in a vision of the practicality of the progression in world affairs towards, and the inevitability of, world peace.

Buddhism
The term Universalism has been applied to different aspects of Buddhist thought by different modern authors. 

The idea of universal salvation is key to the Mahayana school of Buddhism. A common feature of Mahayana Buddhism is the idea that all living beings have Buddha nature and thus all beings can aspire to become bodhisattvas, beings who are on the path to Buddhahood. This capacity is seen as something that all beings in the universe have. This idea has been termed "bodhisattva universalism" by the Buddhist studies scholar Jan Nattier.

The idea of universal Buddha nature has been interpreted in various ways in Buddhism, from the idea that all living beings have Buddha nature and thus can become Buddhas to the idea that because all beings have Buddha nature, all beings will definitely become Buddhas. Some forms of East Asian Mahayana Buddhism even extended the Buddha nature theory to plants and insentient phenomena. Some thinkers (such as Kukai) even promote the idea that the entire universe is the Buddha's body. 

The Lotus Sutra, an influential Mahayana scripture, is often seen as promoting the universality of Buddhahood, the Buddha's teaching as well as the equality of all living beings. Mahayana Buddhism also promotes a universal compassion towards all sentient beings and sees all beings as equally deserving of compassion. The doctrine of the One Vehicle (which states that all Buddhist paths lead to Buddhahood) is also often seen as a universalist doctrine. 

Adherents to Pure Land Buddhism point to Amitabha Buddha as a Universal Savior. According to the Pure Land Sutras (scriptures), before becoming a Buddha Amitabha vowed that he would save all beings and according to some Pure Land authors, all beings will be eventually saved through the work of Amida Buddha. As such, Pure Land Buddhism is often seen as an expression of a Buddhist universalism that compares to Christian universalism. This comparison has also been commented on by Christian theologians like Karl Barth. 

Chinese Buddhism developed a form of Buddhist universalism which saw Confucianism, Daoism and Buddhism as different aspects of a single universal truth.

In Western Buddhism, the term Universalism may also refer to an nonsectarian and eclectic form of Buddhism which emphasizes ecumenism among the different Buddhism schools. American clergyman Julius A. Goldwater was one Buddhist figure who promoted a modern kind of Buddhist Universalism. For Goldwater, Buddhism transcends local contexts and culture, and his practice grew increasingly eclectic over time. Goldwater established the nonsectarian Buddhist Brotherhood of America which focused on ecumenical and nonsectarian Buddhism while also drawing on Protestant vocabulary and ideas. 

The desire to develop a more universalist and nonsectarian form of Buddhism was also shared by some modernist Japanese Buddhist authors, including the influential D.T. Suzuki.

Christianity

The fundamental idea of Christian universalism is universal reconciliation – that all humans will eventually receive salvation. They will eventually enter God's kingdom in Heaven, through the grace and works of the Lord Jesus Christ. Christian universalism teaches that an eternal Hell does not exist, and that it was not what Jesus had taught. They point to historical evidence showing that some early fathers of the church were universalists, and attribute the origin of the idea of hell as eternal to mistranslation, as well as many Bible verses, to argue that historically the concept of eternal hell is not supported either in Judaism or early Christianity.

Universalists cite numerous biblical passages which reference the salvation of all beings. In addition, they argue that an eternal hell is both unjust, and against the nature and attributes of a loving God.

The remaining beliefs of Christian universalism are generally compatible with the fundamentals of Christianity
 God is the loving Parent of all peoples, see Love of God.
 Jesus Christ reveals the nature and character of God, and is the spiritual leader of humankind.
 Humankind is created with an immortal soul, which death can not end—or a mortal soul that shall be resurrected and preserved by God. A soul which God will not wholly destroy.
 Sin has negative consequences for the sinner either in this life or the afterlife. All of God's punishments for sin are corrective and remedial. None of such punishments will last forever, or result in the permanent destruction of a soul. Some Christian universalists believe in the idea of a Purgatorial Hell, or a temporary place of purification that some must undergo before their entrance into Heaven.

In 1899 the Universalist General Convention, later called the Universalist Church of America, adopted the Five Principles: the belief in God, Jesus Christ, the immortality of the human soul, the reality of sin and universal reconciliation.

History

Universalist writers such as George T. Knight have claimed that Universalism was a widely held view among theologians in Early Christianity. These included such important figures such as Alexandrian scholar Origen as well as Clement of Alexandria, a Christian theologian. Origen and Clement both included the existence of a non-eternal Hell in their teachings. Hell was remedial, in that it was a place one went to purge one's sins before entering into Heaven.

The first undisputed documentations of Christian universalist ideas occurred in 17th-century England and 18th-century Europe as well as in colonial America. Between 1648-1697 English activist Gerrard Winstanley, writer Richard Coppin, and dissenter Jane Leade, each taught that God would grant all human beings salvation. The same teachings were later spread throughout 18th-century France and America by George de Benneville. People who taught this doctrine in America would later become known as the Universalist Church of America. The first Universalist Church in America was founded by John Murray (minister).

The Greek term apocatastasis came to be related by some to the beliefs of Christian universalism, but central to the doctrine was the restitution, or restoration of all sinful beings to God, and to His state of blessedness.  In early Patristics, usage of the term is distinct.

Universalist theology
Universalist theology is grounded in history, scripture, and assumptions about the nature of God. That All Shall Be Saved (2019) by Orthodox Christian theologian David Bentley Hart contains arguments from all three areas but with a focus on arguments from the nature of God. Thomas Whittemore wrote the book 100 Scriptural Proofs that Jesus Christ Will Save All Mankind quoting both Old and New Testament verses which support the Universalist viewpoint.

Some Bible verses he cites and are cited by other Christian universalists are:
 Luke 3:6: "And all people will see God's salvation." (NIV)
 John 17:2: "since thou hast given him power over all flesh, to give eternal life to all whom thou hast given him." (RSV)
 1 Corinthians 15:22: "For as in Adam all die, so also in Christ shall all be made alive." (ESV)
 2 Peter 3:9: "The Lord is not slow to fulfill his promise as some count slowness, but is patient toward you, not wishing that any should perish, but that all should reach repentance." (ESV)
 1 Timothy 2:3–6: "This is good, and pleases God our Savior, who wants all men to be saved and to come to a knowledge of the truth. For there is one God and one mediator between God and men, the man Christ Jesus, who gave himself as a ransom for ALL men—the testimony given in its proper time." (NIV)
 1 John 2:2: "He is the atoning sacrifice for our sins, and not only for ours but also for the sins of the whole world." (NIV)
 1 Timothy 4:10: "For to this end we toil and strive, because we have our hope set on the living God, who is the Savior of all people, especially of those who believe." (ESV)
 Romans 5:18: "Then as one man's trespass led to condemnation for all men, so one man's act of righteousness leads to acquittal and life for all men." (RSV)
 Romans 11:32: "For God has bound all men over to disobedience so that he may have mercy on them all." (NIV)

Mistranslations
Christian universalists point towards the mistranslations of the Greek word αιών (Lit. aion), as giving rise to the idea of Eternal Hell, and the idea that some people will not be saved.

This Greek word is the origin of the modern English word eon, which refers to a period of time or an epoch.

The 19th century theologian Marvin Vincent wrote about the word aion, and the supposed connotations of "eternal" or "temporal":
Aion, transliterated aeon, is a period of longer or shorter duration, having a beginning and an end, and complete in itself. [...] Neither the noun nor the adjective, in themselves, carry the sense of endless or everlasting."

Dr. Ken Vincent writes that "When it (aion) was translated into Latin Vulgate, "aion" became "aeternam" which means "eternal".

Catholicism

The Catholic church believes that God judges everyone based only on their moral acts, that no one should be subject to human misery, that everyone is equal in dignity yet distinct in individuality before God, that no one should be discriminated against because of their sin or concupiscence, and that apart from coercion God exhausts every means to save mankind from evil: original holiness being intended for everyone, the irrevocable Old Testament covenants, each religion being a share in the truth, elements of sanctification in non-Catholic Christian communities, the good people of every religion and nation, everyone being called to baptism and confession, and Purgatory, suffrages, and indulgences for the dead. The church believes that everyone is predestined to Heaven, that no one is predestined to Hell, that everyone is redeemed by Christ's Passion, that no one is excluded from the church except by sin, and that everyone can either love God by loving others unto going to Heaven or reject God by sin unto going to Hell. The church believes that God's predestination takes everything into account, and that his providence brings out of evil a greater good, as evidenced, the church believes, by the Passion of Christ being all at once predestined by God, foretold in Scripture, necessitated by original sin, authored by everyone who sins, caused by Christ's executioners, and freely planned and undergone by Christ. The church believes that everyone who goes to Heaven joins the church, and that from the beginning God intended Israel to be the beginning of the church, wherein God would unite all persons to each other and to God. The church believes that Heaven and Hell are eternal.

Hinduism
Author David Frawley says that Hinduism has a "background universalism" and its teachings contain a "universal relevance." Hinduism is also naturally religiously pluralistic. A well-known Rig Vedic hymn says: "Truth is One, though the sages know it variously." Similarly, in the Bhagavad Gītā (4:11), God, manifesting as an incarnation, states: "As people approach me, so I receive them. All paths lead to me." The Hindu religion has no theological difficulties in accepting degrees of truth in other religions. Hinduism emphasizes that everyone actually worships the same God, whether one knows it or not.

While Hinduism has an openness and tolerance towards other religions, it also has a wide range of diversity within it. There are considered to be six orthodox Hindu schools of philosophy/theology, as well as multiple unorthodox or "heterodox" traditions called darshanas.

Hindu universalism

Hindu universalism, also called Neo-Vedanta and neo-Hinduism, is a modern interpretation of Hinduism which developed in response to western colonialism and orientalism. It denotes the ideology that all religions are true and therefore worthy of toleration and respect.

It is a modern interpretation that aims to present Hinduism as a "homogenized ideal of Hinduism" with Advaita Vedanta as its central doctrine. For example, it presents that:

Hinduism embraces universalism by conceiving the whole world as a single family that deifies the one truth, and therefore it accepts all forms of beliefs and dismisses labels of distinct religions which would imply a division of identity.

This modernised re-interpretation has become a broad current in Indian culture, extending far beyond the Dashanami Sampradaya, the Advaita Vedanta Sampradaya founded by Adi Shankara. An early exponent of Hindu Universalism was Ram Mohan Roy, who established the Brahmo Samaj. Hindu Universalism was popularised in the 20th century in both India and the west by Vivekananda and Sarvepalli Radhakrishnan. Veneration for all other religions was articulated by Gandhi:

Western orientalists played an important role in this popularisation, regarding Vedanta to be the "central theology of Hinduism". Oriental scholarship portrayed Hinduism as a "single world religion", and denigrated the heterogeneousity of Hindu beliefs and practices as 'distortions' of the basic teachings of Vedanta.

Islam

Islam recognizes to a certain extent the validity of the Abrahamic religions, the Quran identifying Jews, Christians, and "Sabi'un" (usually taken as a reference to the Mandaeans) as "people of the Book" (ahl al-kitab). Later Islamic theologians expanded this definition to include Zoroastrians, and later even Hindus, as the early Islamic empire brought many people professing these religions under its dominion, but the Qur'an explicitly identifies only Jews, Christians, and Sabians as People of the Book.,  The relation between Islam and universalism has assumed crucial importance in the context of political Islam or Islamism, particularly in reference to Sayyid Qutb, a leading member of the Muslim Brotherhood movement, and one of the key contemporary philosophers of Islam.

There are several views within Islam with respect to Universalism. According to the most inclusive teachings, common among the liberal Muslim movements, all monotheistic religions or people of the book have a chance of salvation. For example, Surah 2:62 states: 

However, the most exclusive teachings disagree. For example, the Salafi refer to Surah 9:5:

The interpretation of all of these passages are hotly contested amongst various schools of thought, traditionalist and reform-minded, and branches of Islam, from the reforming Quranism and Ahmadiyya to the ultra-traditionalist Salafi, as is the doctrine of abrogation (naskh) which is used to determine which verses take precedence, based on reconstructed chronology, with later verses superseding earlier ones. The traditional chronology places Surah 9 as the last or second-to-last surah revealed, thus, in traditional exegesis, it gains a large power of abrogation, and verses 9:5, 29, 73 are held to have abrogated 2:256. The ahadith also play a major role in this, and different schools of thought assign different weightings and rulings of authenticity to different hadith, with the four schools of Sunni thought accepting the Six Authentic Collections, generally along with the Muwatta Imam Malik. Depending on the level of acceptance of rejection of certain traditions, the interpretation of the Koran can be changed immensely, from the Qur'anists who reject the ahadith, to the Salafi, or ahl al-hadith, who hold the entirety of the traditional collections in great reverence.

Some Islamic scholars view the world as bipartite, consisting of the House of Islam, that is, where people live under the Sharia; and the House of War, that is, where the people do not live under Sharia, which must be proselytized using whatever resources available, including, in some traditionalist and conservative interpretations, the use of violence, as holy struggle in the path of God, to either convert its inhabitants to Islam, or to rule them under the Shariah (cf. dhimmi).

Judaism

Judaism teaches that God chose the Jewish people to be in a unique covenant with God, and one of their beliefs is that Jewish people were charged by the Torah with a specific mission—to be a light unto the nations, and to exemplify the covenant with God as described in the Torah to other nations. This view does not preclude a belief that God also has a relationship with other peoples—rather, Judaism holds that God had entered into a covenant with all humanity as Noachides, and that Jews and non-Jews alike have a relationship with God, as well as being universal in the sense that it is open to all mankind.

Modern Jews such as Emmanuel Levinas advocate a universalist mindset that is performed through particularist behavior. An on-line organization, the Jewish Spiritual Leaders Institute founded and led by Steven Blane, who calls himself an "American Jewish Universalist Rabbi", believes in a more inclusive version of Jewish Universalism, stating that "God equally chose all nations to be lights unto the world, and we have much to learn and share with each other. We can only accomplish Tikkun Olam by our unconditional acceptance of each other's peaceful doctrines."

Manichaeism

Manichaeism, like Christian Gnosticism and Zurvanism, was inherently universalist.

Sikhism

In Sikhism, all the religions of the world are compared to rivers flowing into a single ocean. Although the Sikh gurus did not agree with the practices of fasting, idolatry and pilgrimage during their times, they stressed that all religions should be tolerated. The Sikh scripture, the Guru Granth Sahib, contains the writings of not just the Sikh guru themselves, but the writings of several Hindu and Muslim saints, known as the Bhagats.

The very first word of the Sikh scripture is "Ik", followed by "Oh-ang-kar". This literally means that there is only one god, and that one is wholesome, inclusive of the whole universe. It further goes on to state that all of creation, and all energy is part of this primordial being. As such, it is described in scripture over and over again, that all that occurs is part of the divine will, and as such, has to be accepted. It occurs for a reason, even if it is beyond the grasp of one person to understand.

Although Sikhism does not teach that men are created as an image of God, it states that the essence of the One is to be found throughout all of its creation. As was said by Yogi Bhajan, the man who is credited with having brought Sikhism to the West:

The First Sikh Guru, Guru Nanak said himself:

By this, Guru Nanak meant that there is no real "religion" in God's eyes. Unlike many of the major world religions, Sikhism does not have missionaries, instead it believes men have the freedom to find their own path to salvation.

Unitarian Universalism

Unitarian Universalism (UU) is a theologically liberal religion characterized by a "free and responsible search for truth and meaning". Unitarian Universalists do not share a creed; rather, they are unified by their shared search for spiritual growth and by the understanding that an individual's theology is a result of that search and not a result of obedience to an authoritarian requirement. Unitarian Universalists draw from all major world religions and many different theological sources and have a wide range of beliefs and practices.

While having its origins in Christianity, UU is no longer a Christian church. As of 2006, fewer than about 20% of Unitarian Universalists identified themselves as Christian. Contemporary Unitarian Universalism espouses a pluralist approach to religious belief, whereby members may describe themselves as humanist, agnostic, deist, atheist, pagan, Christian, monotheist, pantheist, polytheist, or assume no label at all.

The Unitarian Universalist Association (UUA) was formed in 1961, a consolidation of the American Unitarian Association, established in 1825, and the Universalist Church of America, established in 1866. It is headquartered in Boston, and mainly serves churches in the United States. The Canadian Unitarian Council became an independent body in 2002.

Zoroastrianism

Some varieties of Zoroastrian (such as Zurvanism) are universalistic in application to all races, but not necessarily universalist in the sense of universal salvation.

Views of the Latter Day Saint Movement

See also

 Ananda Marga
 Christianity:
 Liberal Catholic Church
 Primitive Baptist Universalist
 Religious Society of Friends
 Schwarzenau Brethren
 Swedenborgianism (The New Church)
 Trinitarian Universalism
  Church Universal and Triumphant
 Comparative religion
 Ecumenism
 Hypothetical universalism
 George MacDonald
 Mahatma Gandhi Foundation
 Omnism
 Perennial philosophy
 Post-theism
 Religious liberalism
 Religious pluralism
 Subud
 Universal basic income
 Universal basic services
 Universal health care
 Universal suffrage
 Universal Sufism

References

Sources

Further reading
 
  Online.

External links
 Catholic Encyclopedia article on Universalists as a Protestant denomination
 Catholic Encyclopedia article on Apocatastasis/apokatastatis
 TentMaker website - Many free books and articles on Universalism

 
Christian theological movements
Philosophical concepts
Philosophical theories
Religious pluralism
Religious terminology